Margaret Maud Tyzack  (9 September 193125 June 2011) was an English actress. Her television roles included The Forsyte Saga (1967) and I, Claudius (1976). She won the 1970 BAFTA TV Award for Best Actress for the BBC serial The First Churchills, and the 1990 Tony Award for Best Featured Actress in a Play for Lettice and Lovage, opposite Maggie Smith. She also won two Olivier Awards—in 1981 as Actress of the Year in a Revival and in 2009 as Best Actress in a Play. Her film appearances included 2001: A Space Odyssey (1968), A Clockwork Orange (1971), Prick Up Your Ears (1987) and Match Point (2005).

Early life
Tyzack was born in Essex, England, the daughter of Doris (née Moseley) and Thomas Edward Tyzack. She grew up in West Ham (now Greater London). She attended the all-girls' St Angela's Ursuline School, Newham, and was a graduate of RADA.

Career
Tyzack was noted for her classical stage roles, having joined the Royal Shakespeare Company to play Vassilissa in Maxim Gorky's The Lower Depths in 1962, and had major roles in their 1972 Roman Season as Volumnia in Coriolanus, Portia in Julius Caesar and Tamora in Titus Andronicus. She appeared in another Gorky play, as Maria Lvovna in Summerfolk RSC 1974. In 1977 she joined the acting company of the Stratford Festival in Canada, where she played Mrs Alving in Ibsen's Ghosts, Queen Margaret in Richard III and the Countess of Roussillon in All's Well That Ends Well. In a feature of Stratford's 1977 season, New York Times writer Richard Eder noted "One of the main excitements was the discovery of Margaret Tyzack [...] her work here has been a revelation". Tyzack had been engaged on short notice by the Festival when Canadian actress Kate Reid dropped out, which initially spurred some protests from Canadian nationalists. Theatre critic Robert Cushman later wrote that had the protests succeeded "Canadian audiences would have been deprived of three great performances", noting of her performance in Richard III: "there can never have been a better (Queen) Margaret". She played the Countess role again for the Royal Shakespeare Company on Broadway in 1983.

She received her first Olivier award as Actress of the Year in a Revival in 1981 for the National Theatre revival of Who's Afraid of Virginia Woolf? in which she played Martha, replacing Joan Plowright who was ill,.  In 1990, she won the Tony Award for Best Featured Actress in a Play for her role as Lotte Schoen in the play Lettice and Lovage, in which she appeared in both the London and Broadway productions opposite Dame Maggie Smith. The American Actors' Equity initially refused permission for Tyzack to join the New York production, but Smith refused to appear without Tyzack because of the "onstage chemistry" she believed the two women had created in their roles. In 1994, she played Sybil Birling in the Royal National Theatre production of An Inspector Calls. In 2008, she was acclaimed for her portrayal of Mrs St Maugham in a revival of Enid Bagnold's The Chalk Garden at the Donmar Warehouse, London, for which she won the Best Actress award in the Critics' Circle Theatre Awards and the Olivier award for Best Actress in a Play in 2009. In 2009, she also appeared alongside Helen Mirren in Phedre at the Royal National Theatre.

She appeared in two films directed by Stanley Kubrick: 2001: A Space Odyssey (1968) and A Clockwork Orange (1971). Tyzack also appeared in Ring of Spies (1964), The Whisperers (1967), A Touch of Love (1969), The Legacy (1978), The Quatermass Conclusion (1979), Mr. Love (1985), Prick Up Your Ears (1987), The King's Whore (1990), Mrs Dalloway (1997), Bright Young Things (2003), and the Woody Allen films Match Point (2005) and Scoop (2006).

However, it was as a television actress that Tyzack became a household name. She is remembered for her leading roles in BBC television productions. She came to notice as Winifred, Soames's sister, in the well received BBC adaptation of Galsworthy's The Forsyte Saga in 1967, a series shown internationally. She portrayed the character of Gladys King in Dennis Potter's The Bone Grinder (1968), a metaphor for the decline of the British Empire and rise of American power in the post-war world. Tyzack played Queen Anne in The First Churchills; Bette in Cousin Bette; and Antonia, mother of the Emperor Claudius, in I, Claudius. She also played Clotilde Bradbury-Scott in the BBC adaptation of the Agatha Christie story Nemesis in 1987 in Miss Marple.

In the 1990s, she played a major role in The Young Indiana Jones Chronicles television series as the young Indiana Jones' strict Oxford-educated tutor, Miss Helen Seymour. In the 2000s, she made two appearances in Midsomer Murders. In 2011, she joined the cast of soap opera EastEnders, playing Lydia Simmonds. On 13 April 2011, it was announced that for personal reasons she had departed EastEnders and that her role had been recast to Heather Chasen as a result of the nature of the large storyline needing to continue.

Honours
Tyzack was appointed Officer of the Order of the British Empire (OBE) in the 1970 Birthday Honours and Commander of the Order of the British Empire (CBE) in the 2010 New Year Honours, both for services to drama.

Personal life
Tyzack married mathematician Alan Stephenson in 1958 and together they had one son, Matthew.

Tyzack died on 25 June 2011, at the age of 79. Her agent said she was thought to have been suffering with cancer.

Filmography

Discography
 Jerome Kern: Show Boat, conducted by John McGlinn, EMI, 1988

References

External links
 
 
 Selected performances in Theatre Archive, University of Bristol
 Obituary in The Guardian
 Obituary in The Independent

1931 births
2011 deaths
Alumni of RADA
Best Actress BAFTA Award (television) winners
Commanders of the Order of the British Empire
Critics' Circle Theatre Award winners
English film actresses
English radio actresses
English stage actresses
English soap opera actresses
English television actresses
Laurence Olivier Award winners
People from West Ham
Royal Shakespeare Company members
English Shakespearean actresses
Tony Award winners